Spiranthes vernalis, commonly called the spring ladies'-tresses, is a species of orchid that is native to North America, Central America and the Bahamas.

It is a perennial that produces a spiral of white flowers in the early summer.

References

vernalis
Flora of North America
Orchids of the United States